KeyForge is a card game created by Richard Garfield and published by Ghost Galaxy. It was released in 2018 by Fantasy Flight Games, who sold the rights in 2022.

In KeyForge, players take on the role of Archons in the world of the Crucible. Each Archon races to be the first to collect a resource called "Æmber" and forge three keys. KeyForge is sold as premade randomly generated decks, which each have a unique name.

The first set of KeyForge, Call of the Archons, was released on November 15, 2018 with 370 cards in the expansion. The second set, Age of Ascension, was released on May 30, 2019 with 204 cards. The third set, Worlds Collide, was released on November 8, 2019 with 284 cards. The fourth set, Mass Mutation, was released on July 10, 2020, with 259 cards. Dark Tidings was originally scheduled to be released in February 2021, but due to the COVID-19 pandemic was initially released over March to May 2021 with 280 cards.

Gameplay 
KeyForge is a two-player game, with each player using a single deck of cards to play creatures, artifacts, actions, and upgrades. The game aims to gather enough Æmber (pronounced "amber") to forge three keys before the opponent does the same. Creatures can collect Æmber and fight one another, while artifacts provide unique effects. Actions are used and discarded, and upgrades are attached to creatures to improve their abilities.

Each card in KeyForge is associated with a House, with each deck containing cards from three Houses. At the beginning of each player's turn, that player declares a House – they may then only play, use, or discard cards belonging to that House. Unlike similar card games such as Magic: the Gathering and Android: Netrunner, cards do not typically require a cost to be paid such as the expenditure of mana or credits. Instead, a player may play and use as many cards on their turn as they wish, provided the cards belong to the declared House.

Each deck features a unique card back with the name of an Archon. Decks are intended not to be modified after purchase. This is intended to reduce card trading and selling so that "net decking" (the process of researching and recreating more powerful decks) is made more difficult or impossible.

Sets 
New cards are released through expansion sets. Each set features 7 houses, which vary from set to set. Houses used in previous sets may be reintroduced, or completely new houses are added.

Development 
KeyForge was announced at Gen Con on August 1, 2018. An announcement trailer and accompanying introductory article explaining the game were published to the Fantasy Flight website, citing a launch date in the fourth quarter of 2018. Pre-orders for the Keyforge: Call of the Archons Starter Set and Archon Deck were made available the same day, as well as PDF copies of the rulebook. It was also announced that KeyForge tournaments and events would be sanctioned through Fantasy Flight's Organized Play program, details of which were later announced on the Fantasy Flight Organized Play mini-site.

In the game's rulebook, Garfield wrote about the origin of the game, expressing his desire to see "sealed deck and league play" formats return to popularity. He described the contrast between KeyForge and other trading card games as:  Garfield claimed that he had wanted to create KeyForge for 10 years before release, but the printing technology central to the idea was not yet available.

KeyForge was released November 15, 2018, with prerelease events taking place earlier in the month. On the same day the KeyForge Master Vault app and website were launched to help players keep track of decks.

In June 22 2022, it was announced that Ghost Galaxy had acquired KeyForge from Fantasy Flight Games.

Spin-off media
In 2020, an anthology of science fantasy short stories set on the Crucible was released called Tales from the Crucible.

Reception 
IGN described the game as "a bold new idea and a vastly different kind of game format", but questioned the randomization model, speculating that "people won’t be spending tons of money on single rare cards, but that may have been replaced with spending tons of money on random deck boxes in the hopes of getting lucky with a great card combination." Polygon called the game "remarkable" in a hands-on demo and suggested that it "has its work cut out for it just in establishing a marketplace presence".

Upon release, the game was well received. Tom Vasel of The Dice Tower said the decks in the initial core set "feel balanced" and praised the unique aspects of the game and the gameplay.

KeyForge won both the Fan and Academy selected Best Collectible Card Game awards at the 2019 Origins Awards.

References

Further reading

Fantasy Flight Games games
Card games introduced in 2018
Richard Garfield games
Origins Award winners
Collectible-based games